Carenzia is a genus of sea snails, marine gastropod mollusks in the family Seguenziidae.

Species
According to the World Register of Marine Species (WoRMS), the following species with valid names are included  within the genus Carenzia:
Carenzia acanthodes Marshall, 1991
Carenzia carinata (Jeffreys, 1877)
 Carenzia fastigiata B. A. Marshall, 1983
 Carenzia golikovi Geiger, 2017
 Carenzia inermis Quinn, 1983
 Carenzia marismontis Hoffman, Gofas & Freiwald, 2020
Carenzia melvillii (Schepman, 1909)
Carenzia nitens Marshall, 1991
Carenzia ornata Marshall, 1991
Carenzia serrata Marshall, 1991
Carenzia trispinosa (Watson, 1879)
Carenzia venusta Marshall, 1983

References

 Marshall B.A. (1991). Mollusca Gastropoda : Seguenziidae from New Caledonia and the Loyalty Islands. In A. Crosnier & P. Bouchet (Eds) Résultats des campagnes Musorstom, vol. 7. Mémoires du Muséum National d'Histoire Naturelle, A, 150:41-109

External links
  Quinn J. (1983). Carenzia, a new genus of Seguenziacea with the description of a new species. Proceedings of the Biological Society of Washington 96(3): 355-364

 
Seguenziidae